See Also: Walnut Ridge Air Force Station

Marine Corps Air Facility Walnut Ridge is a former United States Army and United States Marine Corps airfield in Walnut Ridge, Arkansas. After it was closed, it was turned into Walnut Ridge Regional Airport.

History

Walnut Ridge Army Airfield
In 1942, the United States Army Air Corps picked Walnut Ridge as the location of one of the new basic flying schools being built to train tens of thousands of military pilots. One of many airfields created in the country's interior during the war, it was built in the late spring and summer, and opened on 15 August 1942 as Walnut Ridge Army Airfield (AAF).

It consisted of a main 6,000 ft runway aligned 05/23 and two 5,000 ft secondary runways aligned 01/19 and 14/28; all were concrete.  

Several auxiliary airfields were constructed to support training:
 Pocahontas Field AF Auxiliary #1 (Naval OLF) 
 Biggers Field AF Auxiliary #2 (Naval OLF)    
 Walcott Field AF Auxiliary #3 (Naval OLF)    
 Bono Field AF Auxiliary #4 (Naval OLF)       
 Beech Grove AF Auxiliary #5 (Naval OLF)      

Walnut Ridge AAF was placed under the jurisdiction of the Southeast Training Command, Army Air Forces Training Command. Training at the Army Air Forces Flying School (Basic) began in October 1943. It put new pilots through the third stage of their flight training, largely with Vultee BT-13 Valiant single-engine monoplane trainers.  Graduates from the basic flight school were transferred to one of Training Command's Advanced flying schools that operated AT-6 Texan Advanced trainers, and upon graduation, they were awarded their pilot's wings and commissioned as 2d lieutenants.  

Trainees flew a total of 160,646 hours from 1 November 1942 to 30 September 1943, well above the average of 129,474 for a Basic Flying School in the Southeast Training Command. Walnut Ridge had .49 accidents per 1,000 hours, lower than the .57 accidents-per-1000-hours average for all schools. But the fatal accident rate at Walnut Ridge was higher: .087 per 1000 hours versus a .052 average.  The hours flown at Walnut Ridge through June 30, 1944, totaled 414,429.  

Walnut Ridge graduated more than 4,600 pilots. Forty-two students and instructors died in training.

Walnut Ridge also hosted a major Air Technical Service Command (ATSC) maintenance facility. It performed phase maintenance and other updates on training aircraft from bases around the United States, including C-47 Skytrains, P-40 Warhawks, P-51 Mustangs, B-17 Flying Fortresses and later in the war, B-29 Superfortresses.

Walnut Ridge's Basic school graduated its last class on June 27, 1944, and closed at the end of the month. The facility was transferred to the Department of the Navy.

Marine Corps Air Facility
Under Navy control, the facility was used by the United States Marine Corps as a pilot training school. VMF-513 was transferred to the base on 14 September 1944 and operated SBD-5s and FG-1D Corsairs.  Apparently the school only operated until 4 December 1944, when the school was moved to MCAS Mojave, California.   The Navy decommissioned the base on 15 March 1945.

RFC Walnut Ridge
With the end of World War II, the Reconstruction Finance Corporation (RFC) established a disposal and reclamation facility at Walnut Ridge for aircraft unneeded by the United States military.  RFC Walnut Ridge became one of the largest disposal sites for aircraft in the United States.   It is estimated that about 10,000 warbirds were flown to Walnut Ridge in 1945 and 1946 for storage and sale. Some sources report the number to be over 11,000.

Fighters, bombers, trainers, and all other manner of aircraft were offered for sale to the public, some of the planes being newly manufactured and flown to Walnut Ridge directly from the assembly line. Some were sold to various civilian entities and to the general public (stripped of their armament and classified military components). However, most aircraft sent to Walnut Ridge were dismantled and their airframes shredded, their hulks finding their way to two large aluminum smelters built on the flightline ramp. The smelters turned the aluminum of the aircraft into ingots, which were  recycled and sold to industry for use in manufacturing a wide variety of items, from toasters to mobile homes.

RFC Walnut Ridge disposed of aircraft until 1951, when it was closed.  The smelters themselves were dismantled the next year and used as bricks for a civil administration/terminal building on the civil airport established by the City of Walnut Ridge.

See also

 Arkansas World War II Army Airfields
 27th Flying Training Wing (World War II)
 List of United States Marine Corps installations

References

1942 establishments in Arkansas
Military installations in Arkansas
Airports in Arkansas
Airports established in 1942
Airfields of the United States Army Air Forces in Arkansas
Walnut Ridge
World War II airfields in the United States
Transportation in Lawrence County, Arkansas
Buildings and structures in Lawrence County, Arkansas
W
W
1945 disestablishments in Arkansas
Military installations closed in 1945